Acridocephala nubilosa is a species of beetle in the family Cerambycidae. It was described by Stephan von Breuning in 1938. It is known from Cameroon and Gabon.

References

Acridocephala
Beetles described in 1938